Elhayi (also Romanized as Elhāyī, Al Ḩā’ī, Alhā’ī, and Al Hayi) is a city in Elhayi Rural District, in the Central District of Ahvaz County, Khuzestan Province, Iran. At the 2006 census, its population was 3,741, in 546 families.

References 

Populated places in Ahvaz County
Cities in Khuzestan Province